is a retired Japanese flyweight freestyle wrestler. He won a gold medal at the 1972 Olympics and a silver medal at the 1970 Asian Games and placed sixth at the 1971 World Wrestling Championships. 

Kato lost to Mohammad Ghorbani at the 1970 Asian Games, but took revenge at the 1972 Olympics.

References

External links 

1948 births
Living people
Olympic wrestlers of Japan
Wrestlers at the 1972 Summer Olympics
Japanese male sport wrestlers
Olympic gold medalists for Japan
People from Asahikawa
Olympic medalists in wrestling
Asian Games silver medalists for Japan
Asian Games medalists in wrestling
Wrestlers at the 1970 Asian Games
Medalists at the 1972 Summer Olympics
Medalists at the 1970 Asian Games
20th-century Japanese people
21st-century Japanese people